John Howard Cassady (April 3, 1896 – January 25, 1969) was an admiral in the United States Navy. He was Commander in Chief, United States Naval Forces, Eastern Atlantic and Mediterranean from 1954 to 1956. Prior to his assignment, Cassady had served as Deputy Chief of Naval Operations (Air) from January 1950 to May 1952, commander of  during World War II and Carrier Strike Group 1 immediately after the war, and commander of the United States Sixth Fleet from 1952 to 1954. He died in 1969 in Boca Raton, Florida, and was buried in Arlington National Cemetery.

References

1896 births
1969 deaths
People from Spencer, Indiana
Military personnel from Indiana
United States Naval Academy alumni
United States Navy admirals
United States Navy personnel of World War I
United States Navy World War II admirals
Recipients of the Legion of Merit